Lynkestis, Lyncestis, Lyngistis, Lynkos or Lyncus ( or Λύγκος  or Lyncus) was a region and principality traditionally located in Upper Macedonia. It was the northernmost mountainous region of Upper Macedonia, located east of the Prespa Lakes.

In its earlier history, Lynkestis was an independent polity ruled by a local dynasty which claimed descent from Bacchiadae, a Greek aristocratic family from ancient Corinth. They were ruled by a basileus, as the rest of the tribes in Lower and Upper Macedonia.

The few existing primary sources show that it maintained connections with the Illyrians and was frequently in hostilities with the Argeads. The inhabitants of Lynkestis were known as Lyncestae or Lynkestai (Λυγκῆσται). Hecataeus (6th century BC) included them among the Molossians. Thucydides (5th century BC) considered them Macedonians. Later ancient sources considered them Illyrians. Modern scholars regard them as Macedonians, Illyrians, or Epirotes (Molossians).

In the second half of the 5th century BC Lynkestis was the strongest tribal state in Upper Macedonia under king Arrhabaeus, son of Bomerus. During the Peloponnesian War the combined army of Lyncestians under king Arrhabaeus and Illyrians won against the joined forces of the Macedonian king Perdiccas II and the Spartan leader Brasidas at the Battle of Lyncestis in 423 BC. 

Lynkestis was annexed or retained by the Illyrian king Bardylis after his victory against Perdiccas III of Macedon in 360 BC. At the Battle of Erigon Valley in 358 BC, the Illyrians under Bardylis were defeated by Phillip II and Lynkestis became part of Macedon. After his conquest, Philip founded Heraclea Lyncestis, which would become the main city of the area in antiquity. Although they became part of Macedon, Lynkestians retained their own basileus.

Name
The etymology of the geographical name Lynkos/Lynkestis and tribal name Lynkestai is uncertain. It seems possible that the Greek word for "lynx" (λύγξ, λύγκος) came from the geographical names that contain the root Λυγκ- Lynk-, which either may refer to the lynx or not, and they may well be of Pre-Greek origin.

Geography

Lynkestis was the northernmost mountainous region of Upper Macedonia, located east of the Prespa Lakes. Lynkestis bordered with Pelagonia to the northeast, Emathia and Almopia to the southeast, and Orestia, Eordaia and the Haliacmon river at some distance to the south. To the west Lynkestis bordered with Illyria. Lynkestis was strategically very important because the major east–west route and one of the north–south routes passed through the core of this region.

Lynkestis was a small region but strategically situated as it was the entry point for Illyrian movements into central Macedonia. The constant threat of Illyrian invasions through the region of Lynkestis into the Argead realm made its subjugation amongst the principal aims of the Argeads. The Tsangon Pass was a mountain pass in the south of Little Prespa that linked the region of Lynkestis to southern Illyria. Another important east-west route between Illyria and Macedonia was controlled by Heraclea Lyncestis, which was founded by Philip to prevent Illyrian raids from the west into Macedon.

Lynkestis and the rest of Upper Macedonia was characterized by cold winters with rainfalls that were very heavy, and hot summers. In this region life was hard and mainly a matter of survival. According to the season of the year the mostly nomadic pastoralist people of the area moved their flocks of cattle, goats and sheep to the various pasture lands.

There were perhaps no towns of any size in Lynkestis prior to the foundation of Heraclea Lyncestis in the mid 4th century BC. The settlements were described only as "villages", which are typical of tribal peoples. In Roman times, the Via Egnatia crossed the area and there were several Roman stations in it.

History

Early period 
The inhabitants of Lynkestis, like other peoples in Upper Macedonia, were mostly nomadic tribes, who were ruled by individual chieftains and who probably lived in basic settlements in the tribal areas instead of actual towns. Their way of life was based on conditions which in general combined sedentary agriculture and transhumant pasturing. Lynkestians, like other Upper Macedonians as well as Lower Macedonians, might well have believed they were descendants of the mythical figure of Makedon, claiming he was a son of Zeus, the chief god of their pantheon. However their chieftains had more in common with their Illyrian and Paeonian neighbors than their supposed countrymen, the Lower Macedonians. As early as the 7th century BC Illyrian raids against Argead Macedonia inevitably also involved the Upper Macedonian regions of Lynkestis, Orestis, Eordaea, Elimea and Tymphaea, because they were located between Illyrian territory and the lands of the Argeads, who were based at Aegae.

Lynkestian kingdom 
Lynkestis was originally an autonomous kingdom in the region of Upper Macedonia. It remained outside the region of power of the Macedonian Argead kings until Philip's conquest in 358 BC. About mid 5th century BC a royal dynasty claiming descent from aristocratic Bacchiad exiles from Corinth, who went to Lynkestis through Corcyra and Illyria, established itself ruling over Lynkestian Macedonians. The kings of Lynkestis were Greek-speaking. In the second half of the 5th century BC Lynkestis was the strongest tribal state in Upper Macedonia under Bomerus' son Arrhabeus, who was the first attested Lynkestian ruler.

A nominal confederacy between Lynkestis and the Upper Macedonian regions of Elimeia, Orestis and Pelagonia as well as Lower Macedonia (Pieria and Bottiaea) was created during the reign of Alexander I of Macedon (c. 495-454 B.C.). Arrhabaeus entered into conflict with Perdiccas II of Macedon. During the Peloponnesian War, a coalition of Lynkestians under Arrhabaeus and Illyrians defeated the joined forces of the Macedonian king Perdiccas II, who had wanted to invade Lynkestis, and the Spartan leader Brasidas, at the Battle of Lyncestis in 423 BC. Besides Brasidas' forces, Perdiccas' faction was supported by Chalcidians, however the campaign against Lynkestis was a disaster because of Macedonian incompetence, resulting in the end of Brasidas' alliance with Perdiccas. A pacification between Arrhabaeus and Perdiccas was started by Athenians. Perdiccas was interested in peace with Lynkestis due to his recent defeat in the Lynkestian campaign, the Lynkestian-Illyrian collaboration, and his new enmity with Brasidas. On the other hand Arrhabaeus was interested in peace with the Argeads to avert future invasions of his realm by Macedon.

In 413 Perdiccas's son Archelaus obtained the throne of Macedon, and he evidently continued his father's conflict against the Lynkestians, probably involving Illyrians. The Macedonian king undertook a war against the Lynkestian Arrhabaeus and his Illyrian or Lynkestian-Illyrian ally, Sirras. Seeking help from the king of Elimeia, the marriage of Archelaus' eldest daughter with the king of Elimeia ensured a solid Upper Macedonian ally for Archelaus' war against Arrhabaeus and Sirras. Additionally, Archelaus made general ameliorations to the military and reinforced the borders of his kingdom, which apparently held the Illyrians momentarily at bay.

The Illyrians (or an Illyrian-Lynkestian coalition) under king Bardylis invaded Macedon in 393 BC, reaching Lower Macedonia as far as the Thermaic Gulf. They expelled the Macedonian king Amyntas III out of Macedonia, and a puppet king, Argaeus II, who may have been a Lynkestian ruler, was appointed to the throne of Macedon. After two years, with the aid of Thessalians, Amyntas retook the throne of Macedon. Another possible Illyrian invasion of Macedon occurred around mid 380s. Amyntas retained his throne, but had to pay tribute to Bardylis. 
After Bardylis' victory against Perdiccas III of Macedon in 360 BC Lynkestis was annexed or retained by the Illyrian king.

Macedonian rule 

After his ascension to the throne of Macedon Philip II wanted the total end of Illyrian influence in Upper Macedonia. In 359 BC, negotiations took place between Bardylis and Philip II of Macedon, following the latter's ascension to the throne that year. In the negotiations, Bardylis demanded, and Philip refused, the continuing occupation of "Macedonian poleis" (i.e., Lynkestian strongholds). In 358 BC Philip mounted a major invasion of Illyrian-held territory, and decisively defeated the Illyrians under Bardylis in the Battle of Erigon Valley in 358 BC. Philip's victories against the Illyrians in 358 BC overturned decades of Illyrian domination upon Macedonia, and he was able to unite Upper and Lower Macedonia for the first time in the history of those regions. After his victory, Philip II is said to have subdued all the area as far as Lake Ohrid, northwest of the Prespa Lakes region in Deuriopus. Soon after his victory in 358 BC Lynkestis, Pelagonia, Orestis and Tymphaea, were incorporated into Philip's greater Macedonia. In the same year, Philip founded Heraclea Lyncestis, which would go on to become the chief city of the region until Late Antiquity.

Lynkestian dynasty
Lynkestian king Arrhabaeus who ruled in the second half of the 5th century BC was the son of Bomerus. According to Strabo, Irra was the daughter of Arrhabaeus, and his granddaughter was Eurydice, the mother of Philip II. Amyntas, one of the commanders sent by Philip II to defeat some of the Greek cities in Asia Minor, was a son of the Lynkestian king Arrhabaeus.

Aeropus of Lynkestis, who was exiled by Philip II when he suspected him of treason, had three sons: Arrhabaeus, Heromenes, and Alexander.

See also
Battle of Lyncestis
Heraclea Lyncestis
Amyntas of Lyncestis

References

Citations

Bibliography 

</ref>

Further reading

External links
Searchable Greek Inscriptions – Regions: Northern Greece (IG X)

 
Kingdoms in Greek Antiquity
Upper Macedonia
Geography of ancient Macedonia